Phom is a Sino-Tibetan language spoken by the Phom people of Nagaland, north-eastern India. Its speakers inhabit 36 villages in Longleng District (Ethnologue).

Alternate names for Phom include Assiringia, Chingmengu, Phom, Phon, Tamlu, and Tamlu Naga (Ethnologue).

Phonology 
All phonological charts are from Burling (1998).

Vocabulary 
A large part of the vocabulary of Phom is inherited from proto-Sino-Tibetan.

References

External links
Phom Phonology
Linguistic Ecology of Phom Language

Languages of Nagaland
Sal languages
Endangered languages of India